Diedrich Erwing Téllez Cuevas (born 31 October 1984) is a Nicaraguan footballer who plays for Managua F.C.

References

1984 births
Living people
Nicaraguan men's footballers
Nicaragua international footballers
Association football midfielders
2017 Copa Centroamericana players
2017 CONCACAF Gold Cup players